was king of the Ryukyu Kingdom from 1526 to 1555. He was the fifth son of King Shō Shin, who he succeeded.

Shō Sei suppressed a rebellion on Amami Ōshima in 1537 and took steps to improve defenses against wakō that same year.

Shō Sei died in 1555 and was succeeded by his second son Shō Gen.

See also 
 Imperial Chinese missions to the Ryukyu Kingdom

Notes

References
 Kerr, George H. (1965). Okinawa, the History of an Island People. Rutland, Vermont: C.E. Tuttle Co. OCLC  39242121
 Smits, Gregory. (1999).  Visions of Ryukyu: Identity and Ideology in Early-Modern Thought and Politics, Honolulu: University of Hawaii Press. ; OCLC 39633631

1497 births
1555 deaths
Second Shō dynasty
Kings of Ryūkyū